Saint Paul School is a Catholic, co-educational, elementary school in Cranston, Rhode Island, United States. It serves students from the cities of Cranston, Warwick and Providence in Rhode Island, USA.

Originally staffed by the Sisters of the Immaculate Heart of Mary, it is now led by a community of lay teachers, staff, parents, alumni, and parishioners of Saint Paul Church. The school is guided by the teachings of the Roman Catholic Church and the Diocese of Providence, Rhode Island.

In 2006, the school renamed its renovated auditorium for Mrs. Jean Patterson, the principal of St. Paul School from 1994–2005. Under Patterson's leadership, enrollment increased, curricula were updated, sports teams were established, and major renovations to the school were completed.

Information
Saint Paul School, under the direction of Principal John Corey and St. Paul Church Pastor Father Francis Santilli, serves students in grades pre-kindergarten through 8.  The school has athletic teams, a computer lab and an after-school program.  The oldest Catholic school in Cranston, it opened its doors in 1922.

References

External links
St. Paul School website

Education in Providence, Rhode Island
Buildings and structures in Cranston, Rhode Island
Schools in Providence County, Rhode Island